Tintaya (Quechua for the cocoon which contains the chrysalis of the moth) is a Peruvian copper mine. It was owned by the Swiss corporation Xstrata (now merged with Glencore). The mine is located in the Cusco Region, Espinar Province, Yauri District, southeast of Yauri. The ore processing rate is at 200,000 tonnes per year and the construction phase of the mine asked for US$1.5 billion investment. Bechtel was hired for feasibility and EPCM for the mine.

See also    
 Mining in Peru  
 List of mines in Peru  
 Zinc mining

References

Copper mines in Peru
Cusco Region